Otto F. Hultberg (14 November 1877 – 24 November 1954) was a Swedish sport shooter who competed in the 1924 Summer Olympics.

In 1924 he won the silver medal as member of the Swedish team in the team running deer, single shots competition. In the 100 metre running deer, single shots event he finished fourth.

References

External links
profile

1877 births
1954 deaths
Swedish male sport shooters
Running target shooters
Olympic shooters of Sweden
Shooters at the 1924 Summer Olympics
Olympic silver medalists for Sweden
Olympic medalists in shooting
Medalists at the 1924 Summer Olympics
19th-century Swedish people
20th-century Swedish people